Ian Robert Horrocks  is a professor of computer science at the University of Oxford in the UK and a Fellow of Oriel College, Oxford. His research focuses on knowledge representation and reasoning, particularly ontology languages, description logic and optimised tableaux decision procedures.

Education
Horrocks completed his Bachelor of Science (BSc), Master of Science (MSc) and PhD degrees in the Department of Computer Science at the University of Manchester.

Research and career
After several years as a lecturer, senior lecturer, reader then Professor in Manchester, Horrocks moved to the University of Oxford in 2008. His work on tableau reasoning for very expressive description logics has formed the basis of most description logic reasoning systems in use today, including Racer, FaCT++, HermiT and Pellet.

Horrocks was jointly responsible for development of the OIL and DAML+OIL ontology languages, and he played a central role in the development of the Web Ontology Language (OWL). These languages and associated tools have been used by Open Biomedical Ontologies (OBO) Consortium, the National Cancer Institute (NCI) in America, the United Nations (UN) Food and Agriculture Organization (FAO), the World Wide Web Consortium (W3C)  and a range of major corporations and government agencies.

His research is partly funded by the Engineering and Physical Sciences Research Council (EPSRC).

Horrocks is the current editor-in-chief of the Journal of Web Semantics and has served as program chair for the International Semantic Web Conference (ISWC).

Awards and honours
In 2020 Horrocks was awarded the BCS Lovelace Medal in recognition of his significant contribution to the advancement of reasoning systems.

Horrocks was elected a Fellow of the Royal Society (FRS) in 2011 and won the Roger Needham Award of the British Computer Society (BCS) in 2005.

Oxford Semantic Technologies
In 2017 Horrocks co-founded the Oxford University tech spin-out Oxford Semantic Technologies Ltd alongside two other Oxford Professors; Prof. Bernardo Cuenca Grau and Prof. Boris Motik. The purpose of this venture was to apply their research to industry and in doing so, they created the high-performance knowledge graph and semantic reasoner, RDFox. RDFox is distinguished by its unique in-memory approach and academic backing.

References

Artificial intelligence researchers
Living people
Alumni of the Victoria University of Manchester
Members of the Department of Computer Science, University of Oxford
Fellows of Oriel College, Oxford
Fellows of the British Computer Society
Fellows of the Royal Society
1958 births
People associated with the Department of Computer Science, University of Manchester
Semantic Web people